Christopher DiDomenico (born February 20, 1989) is a Canadian professional ice hockey forward for SC Bern of the National League (NL). DiDomenico was selected by the Toronto Maple Leafs in the sixth round (164th overall) of the 2007 NHL Entry Draft and sporadically played in the National Hockey League with the Ottawa Senators about a decade later.

Playing career

Amateur
Prior to turning professional, DiDomenico played major junior hockey in the Quebec Major Junior Hockey League for the Saint John Sea Dogs and the Drummondville Voltigeurs. Nearing the conclusion of the 2008–09 season with the Voltigeurs, DiDomenico was signed to a three-year entry-level contract with his draft team, the Toronto Maple Leafs on March 14, 2009.

Professional
On June 30, 2010, the Maple Leafs traded DiDomenico, along with Viktor Stålberg and Philippe Paradis, to the Chicago Blackhawks in exchange for Kris Versteeg and Bill Sweatt. After reporting to the Blackhawks 2010 training camp, DiDomenico made his professional debut in the 2010–11 season with American Hockey League affiliate, the Rockford IceHogs.

DiDomenico played two years within the Blackhawks' system, toiling between the AHL and East Coast Hockey League before opting to leave as a restricted free agent in the offseason to join Asiago HC of the Italian Serie A league in 2012. After two years with Asiago, DiDomenico left Italy but remained in Europe after agreeing to join Swiss club, SCL Tigers of the then National League B for their post-season campaign on February 12, 2012.

Helping the Tigers return to the top flight National League A, and in his fourth season with the Tigers in 2016–17, DiDomenico was approached with NHL interest. While leading the Tigers in scoring with 38 points in 48 games, DiDomenico was reluctantly released from his contract with SCL immediately after agreeing to a two-year deal to pursue his NHL ambitions with the Ottawa Senators under former junior coach Guy Boucher on February 27, 2017. In signing with the Senators mid-season, DiDomenico was subject to waivers before joining the club. DiDomenico successfully cleared waivers on February 28, 2017, and joined the Senators. DiDomenico made his NHL debut on March 9, 2017 against the Arizona Coyotes.

In the 2017–18 season, DiDomenico began the year with the Senators AHL affiliate, the Belleville Senators. After 4 games he was recalled and later scored his first NHL goal with Ottawa on October 27, 2017, against the New Jersey Devils on a late game tying goal. On November 23, 2017, after appearing in 12 games DiDomenico was waived by the Senators, and was then claimed by the Tampa Bay Lightning on November 24. He was immediately assigned on a conditioning loan to the Lightning's AHL affiliate, the Syracuse Crunch. DiDomenico appeared in 3 games for the Crunch, scoring 1 goal.

On December 2, 2017, DiDomenico was claimed off waivers to return to the Senators organization. On February 15, 2018, DiDomenico again left the Senators organization as he was traded to the Chicago Blackhawks in exchange for Ville Pokka. He was assigned to the Blackhawks AHL affiliate, the Rockford IceHogs, where he quickly transitioned as the club's top offensive player by posting 23 points in 22 games to end the regular season.

At the conclusion of the season, DiDomenico as an impending free agent, opted to recommence his European career in returning to former Swiss club, SCL Tigers, on an optional three-year contract on June 13, 2018.

During the 2019–20 season, while in his sixth with the SCL Tigers, on January 15, 2020, DiDomenico agreed to a two-year contract commencing from the 2020–21 season to join fellow NL club, HC Fribourg-Gottéron. At the conclusion of the regular season and prior to the relegation round, the Tigers immediately released DiDomenico following bad behavior and lack of respect for the team.

Career statistics

Regular season and playoffs

International

Awards and honours

References

External links

1989 births
Living people
Asiago Hockey 1935 players
Belleville Senators players
SC Bern players
Canadian ice hockey forwards
Canadian people of Italian descent
Drummondville Voltigeurs players
HC Fribourg-Gottéron players
Ottawa Senators players
Rockford IceHogs (AHL) players
Saint John Sea Dogs players
SCL Tigers players
Syracuse Crunch players
Toledo Walleye players
Toronto Maple Leafs draft picks
Canadian expatriate ice hockey players in Italy
Canadian expatriate ice hockey players in Switzerland